Aleksandar Nikolov may refer to:

 Alexander Nikolov (boxer) (born 1940), Bulgarian boxer
 Alexander Nikolov (poet) (born 1997), Bulgarian poet
 Aleksandar Nikolov (cyclist) (1912–?), Bulgarian cyclist
 Aleksandar Nikolov (swimmer) (born 1992), Bulgarian swimmer
 Aleksandar Nikolov (computer scientist), Canadian theoretical computer scientist
 Aleksandar Nikolov (volleyball) (born 2003), Bulgarian volleyball player